Festival of New Songs (FENS; previously ) is a festival of new and as yet nonaffirmed musicians from Slovenia and abroad. It is the only festival in Slovenia where not only adults but children and teenagers compete too. It takes place in July each year in Izola and Koper and is broadcast by main Slovene television and radio stations. In its more than 20 years of history more than 500 rock, jazz, metal, and pop performers from Slovenia and abroad (Italy, Croatia, and France) have participated, amongst them Kingston, Tinkara Kovač, Lara Baruca, Ylenia Zobec, Siddharta, Alya, Polona Furlan, Andraž Hribar, Monika Pučelj, Sound Attack, Aleksandra Čermelj, Mambo Kings, Nude, Botri, Maja Slatinšek, Johnny Bravo, Foxy teens, and Eva Černe. Its long-term mission is to promote Slovene music, to establish the international cooperation and the exchange with other European countries.

See also
 Melodije morja in sonca

References

External links
 FENS - the official site. Accessed March 22, 2008.

Music festivals in Slovenia
Summer events in Slovenia